The Andrew Johnston Big Scrub Nature Reserve is a protected nature reserve in the Northern Rivers region of New South Wales, Australia. Far less than 1% of the original Big Scrub now remains.

Features

The Reserve's red-brown soil is derived from a basaltic flow from the nearby Mount Warning, and later volcanic flows from the Nightcap Range.

The Reserve is the largest and most important of the remnants of the Big Scrub. The area previously known as "Big Scrub Flora Reserve" is larger; however, it is not considered part of the genuine Big Scrub further to the south.

Over 170 species of trees, shrubs and vines have been recorded at this reserve.

Significant rainforest tree species include white booyong, rosewood, long jack, red bean, koda, cudgerie, white cedar and black bean.

As at most of the Big Scrub remnants, large Moreton Bay figs are prominent at this reserve. It is also a habitat for the seldom seen marbled frogmouth.

See also

 Big Scrub
 Booyong Flora Reserve
 Protected areas of New South Wales

References

External links

Nature reserves in New South Wales
Forests of New South Wales
Northern Rivers
Protected areas established in 1993
1993 establishments in Australia